Stephen, Steven or Steve Davies may refer to:

Politics
Steve Davies (politician) (born 1965), Australian Liberal National politician
S. O. Davies (Stephen Owen Davies, died 1972), Welsh politician

Sports

Stephen Davies (field hockey) (born 1969), Australian field hockey player
Steve Davies (footballer, born 1960), English footballer
Steve Davies (footballer, born 1987), English footballer
Steve Davies (rugby league), rugby league footballer who played in the 1970s and 1980s
Steven Davies (Australian footballer), Australian rules footballer for the West Coast Eagles
Steven Davies (born 1986), English cricketer

Others
Stephen Davies (bishop) (1883–1961), Australian Anglican bishop
Stephen Davies (ornithologist) (1935–2020), Australian ornithologist
Stephen G. Davies (born 1950), British chemist
Stephen Davies (philosopher) (born 1950), New Zealand philosopher
Stephen Davies (writer) (born 1976), British children's writer
Stephen Davies (actor), American actor

See also
Steve Davis (disambiguation)